William Street is a  major thoroughfare in Sydney, New South Wales, Australia.

The street was named in honour of King William IV and was gazetted in 1834.

Route and features
The street's western terminus is located adjacent to Hyde Park where it turns into Park Street at the junction of College Street in the Sydney central business district. The street forms the border between the two suburbs of Woolloomooloo and Darlinghurst.

The Cross City Tunnel, a tolled motorway, follows much of the route of William Street and extends further west to the Western Distributor. The tunnel was constructed in an attempt to ease traffic congestion for through traffic across the east-west of the CBD.

William Street is closed to vehicular traffic for the City2Surf road running fun run and race, held in August annually.

History
William Street was built through the farm land of the valley between the city centre and Potts Point in the 1840s to allow traffic to and from the fashionable and expensive Eastern suburbs around Elizabeth Bay. Originally the NSW Surveyor-General Thomas Mitchell wanted the street to be further to the south, but whilst he was away exploring the interior of Australia, the street was constructed in its present location.

In the 1880s notable Australian poet Henry Lawson lived in a boarding house along William Street before he became famous for his poetry and also wrote a poem titled William Street. In 1909 it was decided to resume the south side of the street to widen the street into a larger boulevard style. The resuming was conducted between 1910 and 1914.

In the 1930s, William Street was the location of a number of pubs and nightclubs, including the Strand Hotel, the Prince Albert Hotel and the infamous Fifty-Fifty Club, where sex workers were provided by Tilly Devine.

During the period between World War I and World War II, William Street was the bustling centre of Sydney's automotive trade, with Yorks Motors in William House set up as the sole New South Wales distributor of Plymouth and Chrysler cars in 1932. William Street also once housed recording studios for the Australian Broadcasting Commission. The Watsons Bay tram service was opened in 1894 travelling along William Street and operated until circa 1901. Tram services were electrified in 1905. Motor buses were introduced after World War I. During the 1930s, the tram service from William Street through Kings Cross ran as frequently as one tram per minute during weekdays. With the combination of trams, buses and cars, the William Street, Darlinghurst Road and Victoria Street junction (Kings Cross) became one of Sydney's busiest intersections and worst bottlenecks. The tram line on William Street and through Kings Cross was closed on 10 July 1960, superseded by buses and later, the Eastern Suburbs railway line.

The Kings Cross Tunnel sits at the eastern end of William Street extending the carriageway to Rushcutters Bay. The cut and cover tunnel was constructed as part of the Eastern Suburbs railway line and required the resumption and demolition of 118
properties. It was opened on 15 December 1975. In November 1987, a tunnel opened beneath William Street to carry traffic coming off the Cahill Expressway towards Taylor Square, as part of the Stage 1 of the Eastern Distributor.

Gallery

See also

References

External links

Further reading

Streets in Sydney
Darlinghurst, New South Wales
Kings Cross, New South Wales